Jazz Sahara is the debut album by double bassist and oud player Ahmed Abdul-Malik featuring performances recorded in late 1958 and originally released on the Riverside label.

Reception

Scott Yanow of Allmusic says, "an early example of fusing jazz with world music... The music is a qualified success, essentially Middle Eastern folk music with Griffin added in. This set is interesting and, in its own way, innovative but not essential".

Track listing
All compositions by Ahmed Abdul-Malik
 "Ya Annas" - 11:10   
 "Isma'a" - 9:10   
 "El Haris" - 11:28   
 "Farah 'Alaiyna" - 6:59

Personnel
Ahmed Abdul-Malik - bass, oud
Johnny Griffin - tenor saxophone
Naim Karacand - violin
Al Harewood - drums 
Bilal Abdurrahman - tambourine
Jack Ghanaim - kanoon
Mike Hemway - darabeka

References

Riverside Records albums
Ahmed Abdul-Malik albums
1958 debut albums